Hernandia stokesii is a species of plant in the Hernandiaceae family. It is found in French Polynesia and the Pitcairn Islands.

References

Hernandiaceae
Vulnerable plants
Flora of French Polynesia
Flora of the Pitcairn Islands
Taxonomy articles created by Polbot